"Tonight" is a song by Australian alternative dance group RÜFÜS. The song was released on 22 November 2013 as the third single from the group's debut studio album, Atlas (2013). The song peaked at number 87 on the ARIA Charts in December 2013.

Music video
The music video was directed by Katzki and released on 4 November 2013. The label called the video "vision quest-inducing".

Track listing

Charts

Certifications

Release history

References

2013 songs
2013 singles
Rüfüs Du Sol songs